is a 1956 black-and-white Japanese film directed by Katsuhiko Tasaka.

It is a jidaigeki action drama set in the Edo period.

Cast 
 Raizo Ichikawa
 Shintaro Katsu
 Yataro Kurokawa
 Ryosuke Kagawa

References

External links 
 

Jidaigeki films
Japanese black-and-white films
1956 films
Films directed by Katsuhiko Tasaka
Daiei Film films
Films set in the Edo period
1950s Japanese films
Japanese action drama films
1950s action drama films